The 2016–17 Utah State Aggies women's basketball team represents Utah State University in the 2016–17 NCAA Division I women's basketball season. The Aggies, led by fifth year head coach Jerry Finkbeiner. The Aggies played their home games at the Smith Spectrum and were third year members of the Mountain West Conference. They finished the season 17–15, 9–9 in Mountain West play to finish in sixth place. They advanced to the quarterfinals of the Mountain West women's tournament where they lost to UNLV. They were invited to the Women's Basketball Invitational where they lost to Idaho in the first round.

Roster

Schedule

|-
!colspan=9 style="background:#002654; color:#FFFFFF;"| Exhibition

|-
!colspan=9 style="background:#002654; color:#FFFFFF;"| Non-conference regular season

|-
!colspan=9 style="background:#002654; color:#FFFFFF;"| Mountain West regular season

|-
!colspan=9 style="background:#002654; color:#FFFFFF;"|Mountain West Women's Tournament

|-
!colspan=9 style="background:#002654; color:#FFFFFF;"|WBI

See also
2016–17 Utah State Aggies men's basketball team

References 

Utah State
Utah State Aggies women's basketball seasons
Utah State
Aggies
Aggies